William Lionel Wyllie (5 July 1851 – 6 April 1931) also known as W. L. Wyllie  was a prolific English painter of maritime themes in both oils and watercolours.  He has been described as "the most distinguished marine artist of his day."  His work is in the Tate, the Royal Academy, the Imperial War Museum, the National Maritime Museum, the National Museum of the Royal Navy, and many other institutions around the world.

Life and career

Birth
Wyllie was born on 5 July 1851 at 67 Albany Street, Camden Town, London, the elder son of William Morrison Wyllie (1820–1895), a prosperous minor-genre painter living in London and Wimereux, France,  by his wife Katherine Benham (1813–1872), a singer. Before marrying W.M. Wyllie, she had had three children by Percy Clinton Sydney Smythe, 6th Viscount Strangford. One of these, Wyllie's half-brother Lionel Percy Smythe, also made a name for himself as an artist.

Early life and education
Most of Wyllie's early summers were spent in France with his parents. He began to draw from an early age, and his natural talent was encouraged by his father and by Lionel Smythe, his step brother. He was given a thorough artistic education; first at the Heatherley School of Fine Art, and then in 1866, aged 15, at the Royal Academy Schools. At the Royal Academy he studied under Edwin Henry Landseer, John Everett Millais and Frederic Leighton, among others. He further demonstrated his precocious talent when he won the Turner Gold Medal in 1869 at the age of eighteen with Dawn after a Storm. His other early love affair, which he shared with his younger brother and fellow artist Charles William Wyllie, was sailing.

Artistic career
From the early 1870s Wyllie worked as an illustrator of maritime subjects for The Graphic. In 1875, the Academy rejected two of his works, and in anger he declared his intention to give up art for a career at sea. Over the course of several sailing cruises as far afield as Europe he laid the foundations for a lifelong love of the sea and of maritime subjects.

Wyllie was a prolific exhibitor, with paintings and etchings shown at the Royal Academy, the Royal Institute of Oil Painters, the Royal Institute of Painters in Water Colours, the Royal Society of Painter-Etchers and Engravers, the Grosvenor Gallery, the New English Art Club, the Society of British Artists, the Dowdeswell Galleries and the Fine Art Society.

Wyllie became a member of the Society of British Artists in 1875, and of the Royal Institute of Painters in Water Colours in 1882. In 1887 he became a member of the New English Art Club. In 1889 he was made an associate of the Royal Academy, and in 1907 he was elected as a full member. In 1903 he became a member of the Royal Society of Painter-Etchers and Engravers.

In 1920 he painted a mural for the Royal Exchange, London Blocking of Zeebrugge Waterway, St George’s Day, 23rd April 1918.

Wyllie was the most distinguished marine artist of his day and his work is still in great demand. From 1906, when he moved to Portsmouth, he became closely associated with the Royal Navy. So much so, indeed, that he was buried with full naval honours in 1931. In a moving ceremony, reminiscent of Nelson's state funeral in 1806, his body was rowed up Portsmouth Harbour in a naval cutter past battleships with dipped colours and bugles calling and quaysides lined with dockyard workers.

Marriage
In 1876, at the age of 25, he became engaged to the 16-year-old Marion Amy Carew (31 December 1860–26 July 1937). They were married in 1879, and between 1880 and 1904 she bore him nine children; Harold (1880–1973), Bill (1882–1916), Dick (b 1883), Eva (1884–1912), Robert (1888–1914), Douglas (b&d 1894), an unnamed son (b&d 1898), Eric (b 1900) and Aileen (1903–1987).  Bill and Robert were killed in the First World War and Eva also died before her father.

Death

Remaining active in his final years, Wyllie continued to sail and paint. His work on the Trafalgar panorama was physically difficult, with much of the painting being done from step ladders, and on most days the work lasted from 10:00 until 17:00 with a short sleep at lunchtime. His daughter Aileen later remarked "At the time it seemed natural, but now that I am old, I cannot think how he did those hours on ladders in his 79th year." Wyllie died on 6 April 1931 at 102 Fellows Road, Primrose Hill, London, and is buried at St Mary's church, within the grounds of Portchester Castle.

Selected works

Paintings, drawings and etchings

Books
Written and/or illustrated by Wyllie
W L Wyllie. Marine Painting in Water-Colour (Cassell and Co., 1901).
W L Wyllie. Nature's Laws and Making of Pictures (London, 1903)
W L Wyllie. J. M. W. Turner, (London: George Bell & sons, 1905).
M A & W L Wyllie. London to the Nore (London, 1905).
M A Wyllie. Norway and its fjords (London: Methuen & Co, 1907).
W L Wyllie. Sketchbook (London, 1908).
Jane, Fred T. The British battle fleet; its inception and growth throughout the centuries to the present day: Volume 1, Volume 2 (London: The Library Press Ltd., 1915).
W L Wylie & W F Wren. Sea fights of the great war, naval incidents during the first nine months (Cassell & Co., 1918)
W L Wyllie, Charles Owen, W D Kirkpatrick. More sea fights of the Great War, including the Battle of Jutland (London, Cassell, 1919).
W L Wyllie. The Old Portsmouth and New Southsea (London: The British Art Company, 1923).
R M Whitlaw & W L Wyllie. Lionel P Smythe RA RWS London, 1923.

Notes

References

Hampshire Telegraph Friday 10 April 1931

Further reading
Marion Amy Wyllie. We Were One, A Life of W L Wyllie (London: G. Bell, 1935).

External links

 
W L Wyllie biography at the Royal Naval Museum website
 
Chronology and photos 
Comprehensive Biography and photo
Biography and photo 
Paintings by W L Wyllie (Canvey island archive).

19th-century English painters
English male painters
20th-century English painters
1851 births
1931 deaths
British marine artists
English watercolourists
Royal Academicians
20th-century English male artists
19th-century English male artists